Half-Minute Hero: The Second Coming is an action role-playing game developed by Opus and published by Marvelous. It is the sequel to Half-Minute Hero. It was initially released as a PlayStation Portable exclusive in Japan on August 4, 2011. It was later localized to English audiences and released via digital distribution on Steam for Microsoft Windows on April 4, 2014.

Gameplay 

Half-Minute Hero: The Second Coming's single player mode features 5 separate episodes, each of which is unlocked after completing the previous episode. Each episode takes place hundreds of years after the previous one, and they all feature the same type of gameplay as the Hero 30 game mode in Half-Minute Hero.

Due to the various bosses in the game being able to cast a spell that kills the main character in 30 seconds, each hero is forced to make a contract with the Time Goddess that lets the player rewind time in exchange for increasing amounts of gold. The player must fight against the clock to defeat the boss as quickly as possible while completing various other objectives.

The episodes of the game are called "Overture", "Judgement", "Revolution", "Ragnarok" and "Destiny".

Side Modes 
In addition to the scenario mode, the game features three side modes:

Multiplayer Battle 
A four-player RPG battle mode. For Half-Minute Hero: The Second Coming, wireless play offers new stages and rules. The players can play tag match or co-op, and can make use of the stages that they create in the game's map editor.

Map Editor 
An edit mode that lets create 30-second quests. Players can place buildings and land formations, set up events where they converse with townfolk, and make other such settings. The quests can be uploaded to a server and shared with other players.

Infinite Battle 
A new mode of play where the players continue defeating demon kings over and over again. Each foe has to be killed in 30 seconds.

Plot 
The plot of the game is largely comedic in nature, and parodies many classic RPG and anime series, including the Final Fantasy series, Chrono Trigger and Chrono Cross, and Gurren Lagann.

The story begins when the special operations soldier Yusha is called upon to eliminate the remnant Evil Lords alongside a group including the swordsman Yashu. When this is complete, he is ordered by Queen Maria to slay 8 elemental dragons who are supposedly trying to destroy the world. However, it turns out that the queen is an impostor and Yusha accidentally opens the gate to the demon world by killing the dragons who had sealed it.

Yusha is imprisoned for supposedly murdering the queen, and Yashu turns against him, seeking dark powers and becoming immortal. Yusha manages to break out of prison and defeat the evil fiends.

After a time skip of centuries, the story switches to Yushia, a young princess whose country is attacked by an evil Empire. With the help of her friends, she is able to defeat the emperor and return peace to the land.

After another time skip, it is revealed that "Gods" descended from on high to destroy the world due to the coexistence of humans and demons, which they found unacceptable. The rough and tumble Yuja, dubbed the "Godslayer", teams up with the blind songstress Coo to destroy the Gods and free humanity.

Ultimately, the Gods are defeated by Yuja, but the Time Goddess suddenly goes insane due to the imbalance of the Timestream, becoming the evil Black Goddess. Yuja fights through time to stop her, and Coo sacrifices herself to bring her back to normal.

Finally, the Time Goddess realizes someone is pulling the strings to make sure the world is always faced by evil, ensuring balance between good and evil. The heroes from all past ages ascend to the heavens with the Goddess' help, and fight the forces of Fate, an entity who maintains the Timestream. Fate is destroyed,  allowing the various races to live by their own rules.

Development 
Marvelous decided to localize Half-Minute Hero: The Second Coming due to the commercial success of the first game on Steam. The localizers tried to match the same style as the translation of the first game done by Xseed. Due to the extreme character limits of the game, text was forced to be concise.

The game was ported from PSP in a week by the programmer Bernhard Schelling.

Soundtrack 
The soundtrack of the game features an even larger cast of composers than the previous game. They include Hideki Asanaka, Motoi Sakuraba, Kumi Tanioka, Hiroyuki Iwatsuki, Kenji Ito, Tetsuya Shibata, Yoshitaka Hirota, Yasunori Mitsuda, Yui Isshiki, Masaharu Iwata, Masashi Hamauzu, Manabu Namiki, Yoko Shimomura, Michiko Naruke, Yasuo Yamate, Takushi Hiyamuta, Maiko Iuchi, Takaaki Nakahashi, Yasumasa Yamada, Yoshino Aoki, Toshikazu Tanaka, Takeshi Toriumi, Tomonori Arai, and Takashi Jinno.

Reception 
Half-Minute Hero: The Second Coming received generally favorable reviews according to review aggregator Metacritic.

Notes

References 

Role-playing video games
Action role-playing video games
Marvelous Entertainment
PlayStation Portable games
Windows games
2011 video games
Video game sequels
Video games developed in Japan
Video games scored by Hiroyuki Iwatsuki
Video games scored by Kenji Ito
Video games scored by Kumi Tanioka
Video games scored by Manabu Namiki
Video games scored by Masaharu Iwata
Video games scored by Masashi Hamauzu
Video games scored by Michiko Naruke
Video games scored by Motoi Sakuraba
Video games scored by Takushi Hiyamuta
Video games scored by Tetsuya Shibata
Video games scored by Yasunori Mitsuda
Video games scored by Yoshino Aoki
Video games scored by Yoshitaka Hirota
Video games scored by Yoko Shimomura
Multiplayer and single-player video games